Morris Howard Hansen (1910–1990) was an American statistician.  While at the United States Census Bureau, he was one of the first to develop methods for statistical sampling and made contributions in many areas of surveys and censuses.

Biography

Early life
Hansen was born on December 15, 1910, in Thermopolis, Wyoming in the United States. The family lived in the nearby town of Worland, Wyoming. He graduated from the University of Wyoming in 1934 with a degree in accounting and then moved to Washington, DC in search of a job. He ended up at the Census Bureau and took classes at the Graduate School of the U.S. Department of Agriculture and at American University where he took courses from W. Edwards Deming and Abraham Girshick. He received a master's degree in statistics in 1940 from American University.  He was later granted an honorary doctorate by the University of Wyoming in recognition of his many contributions to survey research.

U.S. Census Bureau 1935–1968 
One Hansen’s earliest projects at the Census Bureau was a follow-up sample survey to check on the validity of a 1937 depression era voluntary census of the unemployed and partially unemployed. For the census, postal workers delivered a questionnaire to be filled out and returned. There were problems in getting complete and accurate response in the census. He helped design the sample and the statistical procedures to generate estimates of unemployment and estimates of the standard errors of the unemployment estimates, and to project sample estimates to smaller areas through regression relationships.  In the late 1930s and early 1940s the idea of using sample surveys for official governmental guidance, was quite new.  “Before that the Census Bureau had the idea that they couldn’t do sampling because that would discredit the results; they had to have complete coverage.” 

This experience encouraged the Works Progress Administration beginning in 1940  to sponsor the development of a monthly sample survey of households to provide estimates of employment and unemployment, later known as the Current Population Survey. 

His papers with William N. Hurwitz are viewed as foundational building blocks for later developments in design-based sampling theory. The developments in single-stage and multi-stage sampling culminated in the two volume set of books with Hurwitz and W.G. Madow on sampling theory that are still regarded as a basic resources for practicing survey statisticians.

In 1947 he was elected as a Fellow of the American Statistical Association. He also served as President of the Institute of Mathematical Statistics in 1953 and President of the American Statistical Association in 1960. His reminiscences on survey sampling can be viewed on the American Statistical Association Amstat Videos page.

Later years
After retiring from the Census Bureau, Hansen joined Westat, a private research firm in Rockville MD USA, as a vice president in 1968.  He was later elected chairman of the board of directors, a capacity in which he served until 1990. With his long-time colleague, Benjamin J. Tepping, Hansen designed innovative multistage procedures for selecting establishments and goods to price within establishments in the CPI. The US Bureau of Labor Statistics adopted the new methods and later extended them to the Producer Price Index and the International Trade Price Index.

In 1983, while at Westat, he, Tepping, and Madow published an important contribution to an ongoing controversy among researchers in sampling theory and estimation on the role of models in making inferences from survey data.

He died in 1990 at the age of 79 in Washington DC.

See also
Survey sampling

Notes

References 
 Olkin, I. (1987). A Conversation with Morris Hansen.  Statistical Science, Vol. 2, No. 2 (May, 1987), pp. 162–179
 Hansen, MH and Hurwitz, WN (1942). Relative efficiencies of various sampling units in population inquiries. Journal of the American Statistical Association, 37, 89-94.
 Hansen, MH and Hurwitz, WN (1943). On the theory of sampling from finite populations. Annals of Mathematical Statistics, 41, 517-529.
 Hansen, MH and Hurwitz, WN (1949). On the determination of optimum probabilities in sampling. Annals of Mathematical Statistics, 20, 426-432.
 Hansen, MH, Hurwitz, WN, and Madow, WG, (1953). Sample Survey Methods and Theory, Volume I New York: John Wiley and Sons, Inc.
 Hansen, MH, Hurwitz, WN, and Madow, WG, (1953). Sample Survey Methods and Theory, Volume II New York: John Wiley and Sons, Inc.
 Hansen, MH, Madow, WG, and Tepping, BJ (1983). An Evaluation of Model-Dependent and Probability Sampling Inferences in Sample Surveys. Journal of the American Statistical Association, 78, 776-793.

External links
 Article from Amstat News
Joseph Waksberg and Edwin D. Goldfield, "Morris Howard Hansen", Biographical Memoirs of the National Academy of Sciences (1996)

Fellows of the American Statistical Association
Presidents of the American Statistical Association
Presidents of the Institute of Mathematical Statistics
Survey methodologists
1910 births
1990 deaths
20th-century American mathematicians
People from Thermopolis, Wyoming